John Head may refer to:

John Head (Gloucester MP) (died 1391), English politician
John Head (Stockbridge MP) (c. 1656–1711), MP for Stockbridge 1689–93
John L. Head (1915–1980), American basketball coach
John Head (musician), English musician
John Head (cricketer) (1868–1949), English cricketer
John Head (peace activist) (1927–2007), founded CALM, the New Zealand Campaign Against Landmines in 1993
John W. Head (1822–1874), American lawyer and politician
John Head (priest) (1783–1862), Anglican priest in Ireland